Old Bohemia Wildlife Management Area is a Wildlife Management Area in Cecil County, Maryland.

External links
 Old Bohemia Wildlife Management Area

Wildlife management areas of Maryland
Protected areas of Cecil County, Maryland